Christian Alejandro Carrillo Fregoso, is a Mexican businessman, politician, and philanthropist.  He currently serves as a deputy representing the fourth federal electoral district of Baja California in the LXIII Legislature of the Mexican Congress Baja California.

Carrillo is also the Secretary of the Commission of Foreign Relations in the Chamber of Deputies.

On February 6, 2018, at the request of Ramos Hernandez, Carillo rendered a protest in his new entrustment as Legislator of the LXIII Legislature by the Parliamentary Group of National Action (GPPAN).

He is the CEO of ATISA Industrial.

References 

Politicians from Baja California
People from Tijuana
21st-century Mexican politicians
Living people
Year of birth missing (living people)